The Vaught conjecture is a conjecture in the mathematical field of model theory originally proposed by Robert Lawson Vaught in 1961.  It states that the  number of countable models of a first-order complete theory in a countable language is finite or ℵ0 or 2.  Morley showed that the number of countable models is finite or ℵ0 or ℵ1 or 2, which solves the conjecture except for the case of ℵ1 models when the continuum hypothesis fails. For this remaining case,   has announced a counterexample to the Vaught conjecture and the topological Vaught conjecture. As of 2021, the counterexample has not been verified.

Statement of the conjecture
Let  be a first-order, countable, complete theory with infinite models. Let  denote the number of models of T of cardinality  up to isomorphism—the spectrum of the theory . Morley proved that if I(T, ℵ0) is infinite then it must be ℵ0 or ℵ1 or the cardinality of the continuum. The conjecture is a trivial consequence of the continuum hypothesis; so this axiom is often excluded in work on the conjecture. Alternatively, there is a sharper form of the conjecture that states that any countable complete T with uncountably many countable models will have a perfect set of uncountable models (as pointed out by John Steel, in "On Vaught's conjecture". Cabal Seminar 76–77 (Proc. Caltech-UCLA Logic Sem., 1976–77), pp. 193–208, Lecture Notes in Math., 689, Springer, Berlin, 1978, this form of the Vaught conjecture is equiprovable with the original).

Original formulation
The original formulation by Vaught was not stated as a conjecture, but as a problem: Can it  be proved, without the use of the continuum hypothesis, that there exists a complete theory having exactly ℵ1 non-isomorphic denumerable  models? By the result by Morley mentioned at the beginning, a positive solution to the conjecture essentially corresponds to a negative answer to Vaught's problem as originally stated.

Vaught's theorem

Vaught proved that the number of countable models of a complete theory cannot be 2. It can be any finite number other than 2, for example:
Any complete theory with a finite model has no countable models.
The theories with just one countable model are the ω-categorical theories. There are many examples of these, such as the theory of an infinite set, or the theory of a dense unbounded total order.
Ehrenfeucht gave the following example of a theory with 3 countable models: the language has a relation ≥ and a countable number of constants c0, c1, ... with axioms stating that ≥ is a dense unbounded total order, and c0 < c1 < c2 < ... The three models differ according to whether this sequence is unbounded, or converges, or is bounded but does not converge.
Ehrenfeucht's example can be modified to give a theory with any finite number n ≥ 3 of models by adding n − 2 unary relations Pi to the language, with axioms stating that for every x exactly one of the Pi is true, the values of y for which Pi(y) is true are dense, and P1 is true for all ci. Then the models for which the sequence of elements ci converge to a limit c split into n − 2 cases depending on for which i the relation Pi(c) is true.

The idea of the proof of Vaught's theorem is as follows. If there are at most countably many  countable models, then there is a smallest one: the atomic model, and a largest one, the saturated model, which are different if there is more than one model. If they are different, the saturated model must realize  some n-type omitted by the atomic model. Then one can show that an atomic model of the theory of structures realizing this n-type (in a language expanded by finitely many constants) is a third model, not isomorphic to either the atomic or the saturated model. In the example above with 3 models, the atomic model is the one where the sequence is unbounded, the saturated model is the one where the sequence converges, and an example of a type not realized by the atomic model is an element greater than all elements of the sequence.

Topological Vaught conjecture

The topological Vaught conjecture is the statement that whenever a Polish group acts continuously on a Polish space, there are either countably many orbits or continuum many orbits. The topological Vaught conjecture is more general than the original Vaught conjecture: Given a countable language we can form the space of all structures on the natural numbers for that language. If we equip this with the topology generated by first-order formulas, then it is known from A. Gregorczyk, A. Mostowski, C. Ryll-Nardzewski, "Definability of sets of models of axiomatic theories" (Bulletin of the Polish Academy of Sciences (series Mathematics, Astronomy, Physics), vol. 9 (1961), pp. 163–7) that the resulting space is Polish. There is a continuous action of the infinite symmetric group (the collection of all permutations of the natural numbers with the topology of point-wise convergence) that gives rise to the equivalence relation of isomorphism. Given a complete first-order theory T, the set of structures satisfying T is a minimal, closed invariant set, and hence Polish in its own right.

See also
 Spectrum of a theory
 Morley's categoricity theorem

References

 R. Vaught,   "Denumerable models of complete theories", Infinitistic Methods (Proc. Symp. Foundations Math., Warsaw, 1959) Warsaw/Pergamon Press (1961)  pp. 303–321
 
 

Conjectures
Unsolved problems in mathematics
Model theory